Byung-woo is a Korean masculine given name.  Its meaning differs based on the hanja used to write each syllable of the name. There are 17 hanja with the reading "byung" and 41 hanja with the reading "woo" on the South Korean government's official list of hanja which may be registered for use in given names.

People with this name include:
Bae Bien-u (born 1950), South Korean photographer
Lee Byung-woo (born 1965), South Korean guitarist and composer
Kim Byung-woo (born 1980), South Korean film director
Moon Byung-woo (born 1986), South Korean football player

See also
List of Korean given names

References

Korean masculine given names